Hyalurgus is a genus of flies in the family Tachinidae.

Species
H. abdominalis (Matsumura, 1911)
H. atratus Mesnil, 1967
H. cinctus Villeneuve, 1937
H. curvicercus Chao & Shi, 1980
H. flavipes Chao & Shi, 1980
H. latifrons Chao & Shi, 1980
H. longihirtus Chao & Shi, 1980
H. lucidus (Meigen, 1824)
H. ningxiaensis Wang & Zhang, 2012
H. sima (Zimin, 1960)

References

Tachininae
Tachinidae genera
Taxa named by Friedrich Moritz Brauer
Taxa named by Julius von Bergenstamm